Luther Porter Jackson High School was a secondary school for Black students in Fairfax County, Virginia, United States, located at the Annandale-Merrifield corridor. A part of Fairfax County Public Schools, it was the county's first grade 7-12 school for Black children.

History
Before the school was established, FCPS sent Black students to District of Columbia Public Schools (DCPS) schools and the Manassas Industrial School for Colored Youth, later the Manassas Regional High School, a vocational school. Schools in Washington, DC which took Black Fairfax County students included Armstrong Manual Training School, Cardozo High School, Dunbar High School, and Phelps Vocational Center.

Jackson, named after teacher Luther Porter Jackson, opened in 1954. At the time the school was in operation, about 41% of its students planned to attend colleges and universities.

Luther Jackson was a scholar who researched the Readjusters, a Black majority political party that led Virginia under William Mahone from 1879 to 1883.

The high school served as the counterpart to the then-Whites only Falls Church High School before closing in 1965 once the Fairfax School District had racially integrated. Luther Jackson Intermediate School, now known as Luther Jackson Middle School, opened on the former high school campus in September of that year.

References

Further reading
 Lee, Mathelle K. "A History of Luther P. Jackson High School: A Report of a Case Study on the Development of a Black High School" (PhD dissertation). Virginia Tech, Defended on April 15, 1993. URN: etd-10202005-102820. Downloads from vt.edu restricted to those on the Virginia Tech network. See entry at Google Books. See entry at ResearchGate.
 Russell-Porte, Evelyn Darnell. "A HISTORY OF EDUCATION FOR BLACK STUDENTS IN FAIRFAX COUNTY PRIOR TO 1954" (Archive). PhD dissertation. Virginia Tech. July 19, 2000. - p. 295 shows the contract for Harold Lawson, who became the principal of Luther Jackson in 1954.
Luther Jackson High School, The Tiger, 1955-1965

High schools in Fairfax County, Virginia
Historically segregated African-American schools in Virginia
1954 establishments in Virginia
Educational institutions established in 1954
1965 disestablishments in Virginia
Educational institutions disestablished in 1965